Lee Tze Chung (21 May 1911 – 11 May 2012) was a Hong Kong journalist. He was the president of pro-Beijing newspaper Wen Wei Po from 1952 to his dismissal in 1989, when he criticised the Chinese government for imposing martial law in response to the 1989 Tiananmen Square protests.

Early life 
Lee Chung was born on 21 May 1911 in Shunde, Guangdong province, China. He had only attended sishu, a form of private school in imperial China.

Early journalistic career 
Lee began his career in journalism aged 16 as a proofreader for The Seventy-two Guilds Commercial Daily News in Guangzhou and later the editor of Greater China News.

In 1931, Lee was arrested for sympathising with student protesters against the Japanese invasion of Manchuria after the Mukden Incident. After being released from prison, Lee founded and became of the editor-in-chief of Livelihood News. He then became the editorial director of Superior News in Hong Kong and Integrity News in Guangzhou, which he became the editor-in-chief of during the Second Sino-Japanese War. He was also the editorial director of Daguang News, a newspaper in Guangzhouwan at wartime.

After the Chinese Civil War resumed following the end of World War II, Lee began advocating for cooperation between Kuomintang and the Chinese Communist Party with his newspapers. As the editor-in-chief of Jianguo Ribao, Lee was arrested by Kuomintang military police on 2 June 1947 as part of a mass arrest of journalists in Guangzhou when students staged protested against the civil war across China. He was released 12 days later.

Lee later founded and became the editor-in-chief of Hong Kong newspaper Weekly News while holding editor positions at The Chinese Business News and monthly magazine Freedom. In 1949, he became the editor-in-chief of United News in Guangzhou, a newspaper controlled by the Communist Party's United Front department for South China.

He became the vice-president of All-China Journalists Association's Guangzhou branch in 1950.

Editor-in-chief of Wen Wei Po: 1951–1989 

In 1951, Lee became the president and editor-in-chief of the Hong Kong edition of Wen Wei Po. During his 39-year tenure, the newspaper began to assign foreign correspondents and establish subsidiaries to increase income.

Some time in the 1950s, Li Jishen, a leftist Kuomintang member who co-founded Wen Wei Po, gave Lee a share in the newspaper valued at HK$7,000 at the time and a fourth to a fifth of the ownership in the newspaper at founding. Lee later transferred his stake to the state.

In 1952, the Hong Kong government charged Lee on suspicion of publishing seditious articles after Wen Wei Po republished an editorial from People's Daily, the official newspaper of the Chinese Communist Party's Central Committee, that criticised Hong Kong authorities after a demonstration that resulted in the death of a protester. Mass demonstration broke out after the city government allegedly denied entry to a delegation sent by Guangzhou authorities to console victims in the Tung Tau Tsuen fire in November 1951. Two other pro-Beijing newspapers, Ta Kung Pao and New Evening Post, also republished the article. Lee attended court with eight other owners, publishers, editors and printers of the newspapers, who were released on bail for HK$10,000 each.

Only Ta Kung Pao and its two senior staff members were convicted before Chinese Premier Zhou Enlai publicly demanded Hong Kong to withdraw the lawsuit. Prosecutors dropped the case after the British government instructed Hong Kong to rescind the court sentence against Ta Kung Pao.

On 21 May 1989, Lee and Wen Wei Po editor-in-chief Kam Yiu Yu wrote a four-character editorial that read "deep grief and bitter hatred" after the People's Liberation Army enforced martial law during the pro-democracy protests at Tiananmen Square. According to Lau Yui-siu, a Beijing correspondent for Wen Wei Po, Lee said all truths about the protests could be reported and he would bear the consequences. The night before the military crackdown on protesters on 4 June, Lee wrote an opinion piece calling for Chinese leaders to "rein in the horse at the brink of the cliff" but was disappointed that it was too late to prevent the Communist Party from "massacring the masses" and its "brutal crackdown on the people".

A month after the crackdown, Lee fired Wen Wei Po'''s deputy director Chen Bojian, who attempted to realign the newspaper's position with that of Chinese government and criticised Lee for his position against the Chinese central government. On 15 July, Xinhua News Agency's Hong Kong bureau, China's de facto embassy in Hong Kong that also manages Wen Wei Po, intervened. Zhang Junsheng, the vice-director of Xinhua's Hong Kong bureau, announced in an editorial meeting at 2:00am that Xinhua had accepted Lee's resignation he tendered in 1985, which was refused at the time. About 30 Wen Wei Po journalists have resigned in support of Lee.

Media scholar Paul Lee said Hong Kong newspapers, including Wen Wei Po, had transcended the position of political parties and acted in favor of the "highest national interest" before and after the crackdown.

 After Wen Wei Po 
By September 1989, Lee had plans to launch another publication. He approached Jimmy Lai, the founder of the Giordano fashion chain, for financial support, but talks broke down after they disagreed on the editorial policy.

Lee and former deputy Ching Cheong launched China-focused weekly magazine Contemporary in a few months later. Contemporary included news, analysis and opinion pieces on China and Hong Kong. The first issue sold 50,000 copies and operated out of an office in Causeway Bay.

At 78, Lee continued to write a weekly commentary and biography and spent three afternoons in the office every week.

However the magazine launched with little advertising, which Ching said was because of advertisers saw Contemporary'' to confront Xinhua. The magazine later became a monthly publication. It stopped publishing in 1995 because of financial losses of HK$100,000 per month, according to Ching.

Political career 

Lee had been active in politics since the founding of the People's Republic of China. He was an alternate member in the delegation representing the Kuomintang Democratic Promotion Association in the first meeting of the Chinese People's Political Consultative Conference held on 21 September 1949 in Beiping. The KMT Democratic Promotion Association was later merged into the Revolutionary Committee of the Chinese Kuomintang.

Lee was a central committee member of the KMT Revolutionary Committee from 1983 to 1992. He was also a member of the Chinese People's Political Consultative Conference (CPPCC) from Hong Kong.

In 1985, he opposed China issuing the Hong Kong Dollar after the city's sovereignty is transferred to China in 1997 to become a special administrative region. He said using the Renminbi in Hong Kong after 1997 would reduce corruption.

After criticising the Tiananmen Square crackdown, Lee took leave from a CPPCC meeting in July 1989 and stopped attending CPPCC sessions and committee meetings.

Personal life 
Lee was married to Law Siu Lan, a teacher. At 71, Law died of long-term illness on 30 March 1981 at Hong Kong Sanatorium and Hospital and her body was cremated at Cape Collinson Crematorium.

Death 
Lee died on 11 May 2012 at the Tung Wah Group of Hospitals Fung Yiu King Hospital from multiple organ failure. Xinhua News Agency reported his death in a short article consisting of 35 Chinese characters. Lee had been hospitalised since the end of 2011.

Beijing supporters and officials of the Chinese government organised a public memorial at Hong Kong Funeral Home, which was attended by Li Gang, the deputy director of the Hong Kong Liaison Office, and former members of the National People's Congress from Hong Kong. His body was cremated at Cape Collinson Crematorium.

References 

1911 births
2012 deaths
Hong Kong journalists
Hong Kong newspaper people
Members of the 3rd Chinese People's Political Consultative Conference
Members of the 4th Chinese People's Political Consultative Conference
Members of the 5th Chinese People's Political Consultative Conference
Members of the 6th Chinese People's Political Consultative Conference
Members of the Standing Committee of the 7th Chinese People's Political Consultative Conference
Members of the Revolutionary Committee of the Chinese Kuomintang
Hong Kong centenarians
Men centenarians